Vintervegen (Winter Road) is a glacier in Oscar II Land at Spitsbergen, Svalbard. The glacier borders to the mountain of Klampen, merges with Osbornebreen and other glaciers, and the merged glacier stream debouches into the head of St. Jonsfjorden.

References

Glaciers of Spitsbergen